(German) was a campaign of mass murder by involuntary euthanasia in Nazi Germany. The term was first used in post-war trials against doctors who had been involved in the killings. The name T4 is an abbreviation of  4, a street address of the Chancellery department set up in early 1940, in the Berlin borough of Tiergarten, which recruited and paid personnel associated with Aktion T4. Certain German physicians were authorised to select patients "deemed incurably sick, after most critical medical examination" and then administer to them a "mercy death". In October 1939, Adolf Hitler signed a "euthanasia note", backdated to 1 September 1939, which authorised his physician Karl Brandt and Reichsleiter Philipp Bouhler to begin the killing.

The killings took place from September 1939 until the end of the war in 1945; from 275,000 to 300,000 people were killed in psychiatric hospitals in Germany and Austria, occupied Poland and the Protectorate of Bohemia and Moravia (now the Czech Republic). The number of victims was originally recorded as 70,273 but this number has been increased by the discovery of victims listed in the archives of the former East Germany. About half of those killed were taken from church-run asylums, often with the approval of the Protestant or Catholic authorities of the institutions.

The Holy See announced on 2 December 1940 that the policy was contrary to divine law and that "the direct killing of an innocent person because of mental or physical defects is not allowed" but the declaration was not upheld by all Catholic authorities in Germany. In the summer of 1941, protests were led in Germany by the Bishop of Münster, Clemens von Galen, whose intervention led to "the strongest, most explicit and most widespread protest movement against any policy since the beginning of the Third Reich", according to Richard J. Evans.

Several reasons have been suggested for the killings, including eugenics, racial hygiene, and saving money. Physicians in German and Austrian asylums continued many of the practices of  until the defeat of Germany in 1945, in spite of its official cessation in August 1941. The informal continuation of the policy led to 93,521 "beds emptied" by the end of 1941. The programme was authorised by Hitler but the killings have since come to be viewed as murders in Germany. The number of people killed was about 200,000 in Germany and Austria, with about 100,000 victims in other European countries. Following the war, a number of the perpetrators were tried and convicted for murder and crimes against humanity.

Background
At the beginning of the twentieth century, the sterilisation of people carrying what were considered to be hereditary defects and in some cases those exhibiting what was thought to be hereditary "antisocial" behaviour, was a respectable field of medicine. Canada, Denmark, Switzerland and the US had passed laws enabling coerced sterilisation. Studies conducted in the 1920s ranked Germany as a country that was unusually reluctant to introduce sterilisation legislation. In his book Mein Kampf (1924), Hitler wrote that one day racial hygiene "will appear as a deed greater than the most victorious wars of our present bourgeois era".

In July 1933, the "Law for the Prevention of Hereditarily Diseased Offspring" prescribed compulsory sterilisation for people with conditions thought to be hereditary, such as schizophrenia, epilepsy, Huntington's chorea and "imbecility". Sterilisation was also legalised for chronic alcoholism and other forms of social deviance. The law was administered by the Interior Ministry under Wilhelm Frick through special Hereditary Health Courts, which examined the inmates of nursing homes, asylums, prisons, aged-care homes and special schools, to select those to be sterilised. It is estimated that 360,000 people were sterilised under this law between 1933 and 1939.

The policy and research agenda of racial hygiene and eugenics were promoted by Emil Kraepelin. The eugenic sterilisation of persons diagnosed with (and viewed as predisposed to) schizophrenia was advocated by Eugen Bleuler, who presumed racial deterioration because of "mental and physical cripples" in his Textbook of Psychiatry,

Within the Nazi administration, the idea of including in the programme people with physical disabilities had to be expressed carefully, because the Reich Minister of Propaganda, Joseph Goebbels, had a deformed right leg. After 1937, the acute shortage of labour in Germany arising from rearmament, meant that anyone capable of work was deemed to be "useful", exempted from the law and the rate of sterilisation declined. The T4 programme stemmed from the Nazi Party policy of "racial hygiene", a belief that the German people needed to be cleansed of racial enemies, which included anyone confined to a mental health facility and people with simple physical disabilities. New insulin shock treatments were used by German psychiatrists to find out if patients with schizophrenia were curable.

Implementation

Karl Brandt, doctor to Hitler and Hans Lammers, the head of the Reich Chancellery, testified after the war that Hitler had told them as early as 1933—when the sterilisation law was passed—that he favoured the killing of the incurably ill but recognised that public opinion would not accept this. In 1935, Hitler told the Leader of Reich Doctors, Gerhard Wagner, that the question could not be taken up in peacetime; "Such a problem could be more smoothly and easily carried out in war". He wrote that he intended to "radically solve" the problem of the mental asylums in such an event.  began with a "trial" case in late 1938. Hitler instructed Brandt to evaluate a petition sent by two parents for the "mercy killing" of their son who was blind and had physical and developmental disabilities. The child, born near Leipzig and eventually identified as Gerhard Kretschmar, was killed in July 1939. Hitler instructed Brandt to proceed in the same manner in all similar cases.

On 18 August 1939, three weeks after the killing of the boy, the Reich Committee for the Scientific Registering of Hereditary and Congenital Illnesses was established to register sick children or newborns identified as defective. The secret killing of infants began in 1939 and increased after the war started; by 1941, more than 5,000 children had been killed. Hitler was in favour of killing those whom he judged to be  ('Life unworthy of life'). A few months before the "euthanasia" decree, in a 1939 conference with Leonardo Conti, Reich Health Leader and State Secretary for Health in the Interior Ministry, and Hans Lammers, Chief of the Reich Chancellery, Hitler gave as examples the mentally ill who he said could only be "bedded on sawdust or sand" because they "perpetually dirtied themselves" and "put their own excrement into their mouths". This issue, according to the Nazi regime, assumed a new urgency in wartime.

After the invasion of Poland, Hermann Pfannmüller (Head of the State Hospital near Munich) said

Pfannmüller advocated killing by a gradual decrease of food, which he believed was more merciful than poison injections.

The German eugenics movement had an extreme wing even before the Nazis came to power. As early as 1920, Alfred Hoche and Karl Binding advocated killing people whose lives were "unworthy of life". Darwinism was interpreted by them as justification of the demand for "beneficial" genes and eradication of the "harmful" ones. The genes of those who did not fight (the worst genes) then proliferated freely, accelerating biological and cultural degeneration". The advocacy of eugenics in Germany gained ground after 1930, when the Depression was used to excuse cuts in funding to state mental hospitals, creating squalor and overcrowding.

Many German eugenicists were nationalists and antisemites, who embraced the Nazi regime with enthusiasm. Many were appointed to positions in the Health Ministry and German research institutes. Their ideas were gradually adopted by the majority of the German medical profession, from which Jewish and communist doctors were soon purged. During the 1930s, the Nazi Party had carried out a campaign of propaganda in favour of euthanasia. The National Socialist Racial and Political Office (NSRPA) produced leaflets, posters and short films to be shown in cinemas, pointing out to Germans the cost of maintaining asylums for the incurably ill and insane. These films included The Inheritance (1935), The Victim of the Past (1937), which was given a major première in Berlin and was shown in all German cinemas, and I Accuse (1941) which was based on a novel by Hellmuth Unger, a consultant for "child euthanasia".

Killing of children

In mid-1939, Hitler authorised the creation of the Reich Committee for the Scientific Registering of Serious Hereditary and Congenital Illnesses led by his physician, Karl Brandt, administered by Herbert Linden of the Interior Ministry, leader of German Red Cross  Ernst-Robert Grawitz and SS- Viktor Brack. Brandt and Bouhler were authorised to approve applications to kill children in relevant circumstances, though Bouhler left the details to subordinates such as Brack and SA- Werner Blankenburg.

Extermination centres were established at six existing psychiatric hospitals: Bernburg, Brandenburg, Grafeneck, Hadamar, Hartheim, and Sonnenstein. One thousand children under the age of 17 were killed at the institutions Am Spiegelgrund and Gugging in Austria. They played a crucial role in developments leading to the Holocaust. As a related aspect of the "medical" and scientific basis of this programme, the Nazi doctors took thousands of brains from 'euthanasia' victims for research.

From August 1939, the Interior Ministry registered children with disabilities, requiring doctors and midwives to report all cases of newborns with severe disabilities; the 'guardian' consent element soon disappeared. Those to be killed were identified as "all children under three years of age in whom any of the following 'serious hereditary diseases' were 'suspected': idiocy and Down syndrome (especially when associated with blindness and deafness); microcephaly; hydrocephaly; malformations of all kinds, especially of limbs, head, and spinal column; and paralysis, including spastic conditions". The reports were assessed by a panel of medical experts, of whom three were required to give their approval before a child could be killed.

The Ministry used deceit when dealing with parents or guardians, particularly in Catholic areas, where parents were generally uncooperative. Parents were told that their children were being sent to "Special Sections", where they would receive improved treatment. The children sent to these centres were kept for "assessment" for a few weeks and then killed by injection of toxic chemicals, typically phenol; their deaths were recorded as "pneumonia". Autopsies were usually performed and brain samples were taken to be used for "medical research". Post mortem examinations apparently helped to ease the consciences of many of those involved, giving them the feeling that there was a genuine medical purpose to the killings. The most notorious of these institutions in Austria was Am Spiegelgrund, where from 1940 to 1945, 789 children were killed by lethal injection, gas poisoning and physical abuse. Children's brains were preserved in jars of formaldehyde and stored in the basement of the clinic and in the private collection of Heinrich Gross, one of the institution's directors, until 2001.

When the Second World War began in September 1939, less rigorous standards of assessment and a quicker approval process were adopted. Older children and adolescents were included and the conditions covered came to include

More pressure was placed on parents to agree to their children being sent away. Many parents suspected what was happening and refused consent, especially when it became apparent that institutions for children with disabilities were being systematically cleared of their charges. The parents were warned that they could lose custody of all their children and if that did not suffice, the parents could be threatened with call-up for 'labour duty'. By 1941, more than 5,000 children had been killed. The last child to be killed under  was Richard Jenne on 29 May 1945, in the children's ward of the Kaufbeuren-Irsee state hospital in Bavaria, Germany, more than three weeks after US Army troops had occupied the town.

Killing of adults

Invasion of Poland

Brandt and Bouhler developed plans to expand the programme of euthanasia to adults. In July 1939 they held a meeting attended by Conti and Professor Werner Heyde, head of the SS medical department. This meeting agreed to arrange a national register of all institutionalised people with mental illnesses or physical disabilities. The first adults with disabilities to be killed en masse by the Nazi regime were Poles. After the invasion on 1 September 1939, adults with disabilities were shot by the SS men of  16,  and  under the command of SS- Rudolf Tröger, with overall command by Reinhard Heydrich, during the genocidal Operation Tannenberg.

All hospitals and mental asylums of the Wartheland were emptied. The region was incorporated into Germany and earmarked for resettlement by  following the German conquest of Poland. In the Danzig (now Gdańsk) area, some 7,000 Polish patients of various institutions were shot and 10,000 were killed in the Gdynia area. Similar measures were taken in other areas of Poland destined for incorporation into Germany. The first experiments with the gassing of patients were conducted in October 1939 at Fort VII in Posen (occupied Poznań), where hundreds of prisoners were killed by means of carbon monoxide poisoning, in an improvised gas chamber developed by Albert Widmann, chief chemist of the German Criminal Police (Kripo). In December 1939,  Heinrich Himmler witnessed one of these gassings, ensuring that this invention would later be put to much wider uses.

The idea of killing adult mental patients soon spread from occupied Poland to adjoining areas of Germany, probably because Nazi Party and SS officers in these areas were most familiar with what was happening in Poland. These were also the areas where Germans wounded from the Polish campaign were expected to be accommodated, which created a demand for hospital space. The  of Pomerania, Franz Schwede-Coburg, sent 1,400 patients from five Pomeranian hospitals to undisclosed locations in occupied Poland, where they were shot. The  of East Prussia, Erich Koch, had 1,600 patients killed out of sight. More than 8,000 Germans were killed in this initial wave of killings carried out on the orders of local officials, although Himmler certainly knew and approved of them.

The legal basis for the programme was a 1939 letter from Hitler, not a formal "Führer's decree" with the force of law. Hitler bypassed Conti, the Health Minister and his department, who might have raised questions about the legality of the programme and entrusted it to Bouhler and Brandt.

The killings were administered by Viktor Brack and his staff from  4, disguised as the "Charitable Foundation for Cure and Institutional Care" offices which served as the front and was supervised by Bouhler and Brandt. The officials in charge included Herbert Linden, who had been involved in the child killing programme; Ernst-Robert Grawitz, chief physician of the SS and August Becker, an SS chemist. The officials selected the doctors who were to carry out the operational part of the programme; based on political reliability as long-term Nazis, professional reputation and sympathy for radical eugenics. The list included physicians who had proved their worth in the child-killing programme, such as Unger, Heinze and Hermann Pfannmüller. The recruits were mostly psychiatrists, notably Professor Carl Schneider of Heidelberg, Professor Max de Crinis of Berlin and Professor Paul Nitsche from the Sonnenstein state institution. Heyde became the operational leader of the programme, succeeded later by Nitsche.

Listing of targets from hospital records

In early October, all hospitals, nursing homes, old-age homes and sanatoria were required to report all patients who had been institutionalised for five years or more, who had been committed as "criminally insane", who were of "non-Aryan race" or who had been diagnosed with any on a list of conditions. The conditions included schizophrenia, epilepsy, Huntington's chorea, advanced syphilis, senile dementia, paralysis, encephalitis and "terminal neurological conditions generally". Many doctors and administrators assumed that the reports were to identify inmates who were capable of being drafted for "labour service" and tended to overstate the degree of incapacity of their patients, to protect them from labour conscription. When some institutions refused to co-operate, teams of T4 doctors (or Nazi medical students) visited and compiled the lists, sometimes in a haphazard and ideologically motivated way. During 1940, all Jewish patients were removed from institutions and killed.

As with child inmates, adults were assessed by a panel of experts, working at the  offices. The experts were required to make their judgements on the reports, not medical histories or examinations. Sometimes they dealt with hundreds of reports at a time. On each they marked a + (death), a - (life), or occasionally a ? meaning that they were unable to decide. Three "death" verdicts condemned the person and as with reviews of children, the process became less rigorous, the range of conditions considered "unsustainable" grew broader and zealous Nazis further down the chain of command increasingly made decisions on their own initiative.

Gassing
The first gassings in Germany proper took place in January 1940 at the Brandenburg Euthanasia Centre. The operation was headed by Brack, who said "the needle belongs in the hand of the doctor". Bottled pure carbon monoxide gas was used. At trials, Brandt described the process as a "major advance in medical history". Once the efficacy of the method was confirmed, it became standard and was instituted at a number of centres in Germany under the supervision of Widmann, Becker and Christian Wirth – a Kripo officer who later played a prominent role in the Final Solution (extermination of Jews) as commandant of newly built death camps in occupied Poland. In addition to Brandenburg, the killing centres included Grafeneck Castle in Baden-Württemberg (10,824 dead), Schloss Hartheim near Linz in Austria (over 18,000 dead), Sonnenstein in Saxony (15,000 dead), Bernburg in Saxony-Anhalt and Hadamar in Hesse (14,494 dead). The same facilities were also used to kill mentally sound prisoners transferred from concentration camps in Germany, Austria and occupied parts of Poland.

Condemned patients were transferred from their institutions to new centres in T4 Charitable Ambulance buses, called the Community Patients Transports Service. They were run by teams of SS men wearing white coats, to give it an air of medical care. To prevent the families and doctors of the patients from tracing them, the patients were often first sent to transit centres in major hospitals, where they were supposedly assessed. They were moved again to special treatment centres. Families were sent letters explaining that owing to wartime regulations, it was not possible for them to visit relatives in these centres. Most of these patients were killed within 24 hours of arriving at the centres and their bodies cremated. For every person killed, a death certificate was prepared, giving a false but plausible cause of death. This was sent to the family along with an urn of ashes (random ashes, since the victims were cremated ). The preparation of thousands of falsified death certificates took up most of the working day of the doctors who operated the centres.

During 1940, the centres at Brandenburg, Grafeneck and Hartheim killed nearly 10,000 people each, while another 6,000 were killed at Sonnenstein. In all, about 35,000 people were killed in T4 operations that year. Operations at Brandenburg and Grafeneck were wound up at the end of the year, partly because the areas they served had been cleared and partly because of public opposition. In 1941, however, the centres at Bernburg and Sonnenstein increased their operations, while Hartheim (where Wirth and Franz Stangl were successively commandants) continued as before. Another 35,000 people were killed before August 1941, when the T4 programme was officially shut down by Hitler. Even after that date the centres continued to be used to kill concentration camp inmates: eventually some 20,000 people in this category were killed.

In 1971, Gitta Sereny conducted interviews with Stangl, who was in prison in Düsseldorf, after having been convicted of co-responsibility for killing 900,000 people, while commandant of the Sobibor and Treblinka extermination camps in Poland. Stangl gave Sereny a detailed account of the operations of the T4 programme based on his time as commandant of the killing facility at the Hartheim institute. He described how the inmates of various asylums were removed and transported by bus to Hartheim. Some were in no mental state to know what was happening to them but many were perfectly sane and for them various forms of deception were used. They were told they were at a special clinic where they would receive improved treatment and were given a brief medical examination on arrival. They were induced to enter what appeared to be a shower block, where they were gassed with carbon monoxide (the ruse was also used at extermination camps).

Number of euthanasia victims
The SS and police from  responsible for murdering the majority of patients in the annexed territories of Poland since October 1939, took their salaries from the normal police fund, supervised by the administration of the newly formed Wartheland district; the programme in Germany and occupied Poland was overseen by Heinrich Himmler. Before 2013, it was believed that 70,000 persons were murdered in the euthanasia programme, but the German Federal Archives reported that research in the archives of former East Germany indicated that the number of victims in Germany and Austria from 1939 to 1945 was about 200,000 persons and that another 100,000 persons were victims in other European countries. In the German T4 centres there was at least the semblance of legality in keeping records and writing letters. In Polish psychiatric hospitals no one was left behind. Killings were inflicted using gas-vans, sealed army bunkers and machine guns; families were not informed about the murdered relatives and the empty wards were handed over to the SS.

Technology and personnel transfer to death camps 

After the official end of the euthanasia programme in 1941, most of the personnel and high-ranking officials, as well as gassing technology and the techniques used to deceive victims, were transferred under the jurisdiction of the national medical division of the Reich Interior Ministry. Further gassing experiments with the use of mobile gas chambers were conducted at Soldau concentration camp by Herbert Lange following Operation Barbarossa. Lange was appointed commander of the Chełmno extermination camp in December 1941. He was given three gas vans by the Reich Security Main Office (RSHA), converted by the Gaubschat GmbH in Berlin and before February 1942, killed 3,830 Polish Jews and around 4,000 Romani, under the guise of "resettlement". After the Wannsee conference, implementation of gassing technology was accelerated by Heydrich. Beginning in the spring of 1942, three killing factories were built secretly in east-central Poland. The SS officers responsible for the earlier , including Wirth, Stangl and Irmfried Eberl, had important roles in the implementation of the "Final Solution" for the next two years. The first killing centre, equipped with stationary gas chambers, modelled on technology developed under , was established at Bełżec in the General Government territory of occupied Poland; the decision preceded the Wannsee Conference of January 1942 by three months.

Opposition

In January 1939, Brack commissioned a paper from Professor of Moral Theology at the University of Paderborn, Joseph Mayer, on the likely reactions of the churches in the event of a state euthanasia programme being instituted. Mayera longstanding euthanasia advocatereported that the churches would not oppose such a programme if it was seen to be in the national interest. Brack showed this paper to Hitler in July and it may have increased his confidence that the "euthanasia" programme would be acceptable to German public opinion. Notably, when Sereny interviewed Mayer shortly before his death in 1967, he denied that he formally condoned the killing of people with disabilities but no copies of this paper are known to survive.

Some bureaucrats opposed the T4 programme; Lothar Kreyssig, a district judge and member of the Confessing Church, wrote to Gürtner protesting that the action was illegal since no law or formal decree from Hitler had authorised it. Gürtner replied, "If you cannot recognise the will of the Führer as a source of law, then you cannot remain a judge" and had Kreyssig dismissed. Hitler had a policy of not issuing written instructions for matters which could later be condemned by the international community but made an exception when he provided Bouhler and Brack with written authority for the T4 programme. Hitler wrote a confidential letter in October 1939 to overcome opposition within the German state bureaucracy. Hitler told Bouhler that, "the Führer's Chancellery must under no circumstances be seen to be active in this matter". The Justice Minister, Franz Gürtner, had to be shown Hitler's letter in August 1940 to gain his co-operation.

Exposure
In the towns where the killing centres were located, some people saw the inmates arrive in buses, saw smoke from the crematoria chimneys and noticed that the buses were returning empty. In Hadamar, ashes containing human hair rained down on the town and despite the strictest orders, some of the staff at the killing centres talked about what was going on. In some cases families could tell that the causes of death in certificates were false, e.g. when a patient was claimed to have died of appendicitis, even though his appendix had been removed some years earlier. In other cases, families in the same town would receive death certificates on the same day. In May 1941, the Frankfurt County Court wrote to Gürtner describing scenes in Hadamar, where children shouted in the streets that people were being taken away in buses to be gassed.

During 1940, rumours of what was taking place spread and many Germans withdrew their relatives from asylums and sanatoria to care for them at home, often with great expense and difficulty. In some places doctors and psychiatrists co-operated with families to have patients discharged or if the families could afford it, transferred them to private clinics beyond the reach of T4. Other doctors "re-diagnosed" patients so that they no longer met the T4 criteria, which risked exposure when Nazi zealots from Berlin conducted inspections. In Kiel, Professor Hans Gerhard Creutzfeldt managed to save nearly all of his patients. Lifton listed a handful of psychiatrists and administrators who opposed the killings; many doctors collaborated, either through ignorance, agreement with Nazi eugenicist policies or fear of the regime.

Protest letters were sent to the Reich Chancellery and the Ministry of Justice, some from Nazi Party members. The first open protest against the removal of people from asylums took place at Absberg in Franconia in February 1941 and others followed. The SD report on the incident at Absberg noted that "the removal of residents from the Ottilien Home has caused a great deal of unpleasantness" and described large crowds of Catholic townspeople, among them Party members, protesting against the action. Similar petitions and protests occurred throughout Austria as rumours spread of mass killings at the Hartheim Euthanasia Centre and of mysterious deaths at the children's clinic,  in Vienna. Anna Wödl, a nurse and mother of a child with a disability, vehemently petitioned to Hermann Linden at the Reich Ministry of the Interior in Berlin to prevent her son, Alfred, from being transferred from Gugging, where he lived and which also became a euthanasia center. His brain was preserved in formaldehyde for "research" and stored in the clinic for sixty years.

Church protests

The Lutheran theologian Friedrich von Bodelschwingh (director of the Bethel Institution for Epilepsy at Bielefeld) and Pastor Paul-Gerhard Braune (director of the Hoffnungstal Institution near Berlin) protested. Bodelschwingh negotiated directly with Brandt and indirectly with Hermann Göring, whose cousin was a prominent psychiatrist. Braune had meetings with Gürtner, who was always dubious about the legality of the programme. Gürtner later wrote a strongly worded letter to Hitler protesting against it; Hitler did not read it but was told about it by Lammers. On 4 December 1940, Reinhold Sautter, the Supreme Church Councillor of the Württemberg State Church, complained to the Nazi Ministerial Councillor Eugen Stähle against the murders in Grafeneck Castle. Stähle said "The fifth commandment Thou shalt not kill, is no commandment of God but a Jewish invention".

Bishop Heinrich Wienken of Berlin, a leading member of the Caritas Association, was selected by the Fulda episcopal synod to represent the views of the Catholic Church in meetings with T4 operatives. In 2008, Michael Burleigh wrote

Despite a decree issued by the Vatican on 2 December 1940 stating that the T4 policy was "against natural and positive Divine law" and that "The direct killing of an innocent person because of mental or physical defects is not allowed", the Catholic Church hierarchy in Germany decided to take no further action. Incensed by the Nazi appropriation of Church property in Münster to accommodate people made homeless by an air raid, in July and August 1941, the Bishop of Münster, Clemens August Graf von Galen, gave four sermons criticising the Nazis for arresting Jesuits, confiscating church property and for the euthanasia program. Galen sent the text to Hitler by telegram, calling on

Galen's sermons were not reported in the German press but were circulated illegally in leaflets. The text was dropped by the Royal Air Force over German troops. In 2009, Richard J. Evans wrote that "This was the strongest, most explicit and most widespread protest movement against any policy since the beginning of the Third Reich". Local Nazis asked for Galen to be arrested but Goebbels told Hitler that such action would provoke a revolt in Westphalia and Hitler decided to wait until after the war to take revenge.

In 1986, Lifton wrote, "Nazi leaders faced the prospect of either having to imprison prominent, highly admired clergymen and other protesters – a course with consequences in terms of adverse public reaction they greatly feared – or else end the programme". Evans considered it "at least possible, even indeed probable" that the T4 programme would have continued beyond Hitler's initial quota of 70,000 deaths but for the public reaction to Galen's sermon. Henry Friedlander wrote that it was not the criticism from the Church but rather the loss of secrecy and "general popular disquiet about the way euthanasia was implemented" that caused the killings to be suspended.

Galen had detailed knowledge of the euthanasia programme by July 1940 but did not speak out until almost a year after Protestants had begun to protest. In 2002, Beth A. Griech-Polelle wrote:

On 29 June 1943, Pope Pius XII issued the encyclical , in which he condemned the fact that "physically deformed people, mentally disturbed people and hereditarily ill people have at times been robbed of their lives" in Germany. Following this, in September 1943, a bold but ineffectual condemnation was read by bishops from pulpits across Germany, denouncing the killing of "the innocent and defenceless mentally handicapped and mentally ill, the incurably infirm and fatally wounded, innocent hostages and disarmed prisoners of war and criminal offenders, people of a foreign race or descent".

Suspension and continuity

On 24 August 1941, Hitler ordered the suspension of the T4 killings. After the invasion of the Soviet Union in June, many T4 personnel were transferred to the eastern front. The projected death total for the T4 programme of 70,000 deaths had been reached by August 1941. The termination of the T4 programme did not end the killing of people with disabilities; from the end of 1941, on the initiative of institute directors and local party leaders, the killing of adults and children continued, albeit less systematically, until the end of the war. After the bombing of Hamburg in July 1943, occupants of old age homes were killed. In the post-war trial of  Dr. Hilda Wernicke, Berlin, August 1946, testimony was given that "500 old, broken women" who had survived the bombing of Stettin in June 1944 were euthanised at the Meseritz-Oberwalde Asylum. The Hartheim, Bernberg, Sonnenstein and Hardamar centres continued in use as "wild euthanasia" centres to kill people sent from all over Germany, until 1945. The methods were lethal injection or starvation, those employed before use of gas chambers. By the end of 1941, about 100,000 people had been killed in the T4 programme. From mid-1941, concentration camp prisoners too feeble or too much trouble to keep alive were murdered after a cursory psychiatric examination under Action 14f13.

Post-war

Doctors' trial

After the war a series of trials was held in connection with the Nazi euthanasia programme at various places including: Dresden, Frankfurt, Graz, Nuremberg and Tübingen. In December 1946 an American military tribunal (commonly called the Doctors' trial) prosecuted 23 doctors and administrators for their roles in war crimes and crimes against humanity. These crimes included the systematic killing of those deemed "unworthy of life", including people with mental disabilities, the people who were institutionalised mentally ill, and people with physical impairments. After 140 days of proceedings, including the testimony of 85 witnesses and the submission of 1,500 documents, in August 1947 the court pronounced 16 of the defendants guilty. Seven were sentenced to death; the men, including Brandt and Brack, were executed on 2 June 1948.

The indictment read in part:

Earlier, in 1945, American forces tried seven staff members of the Hadamar killing centre for the killing of Soviet and Polish nationals, which was within their jurisdiction under international law, as these were the citizens of wartime allies. (Hadamar was within the American Zone of Occupation in Germany. This was before the Allied resolution of December 1945, to prosecute individuals for "crimes against humanity" for such mass atrocities.) Alfons Klein, Heinrich Ruoff and Karl Willig were sentenced to death and executed; the other four were given long prison sentences. In 1946, reconstructed German courts tried members of the Hadamar staff for the murders of nearly 15,000 German citizens there. The chief physician, Adolf Wahlmann and Irmgard Huber, the head nurse, were convicted.

Other perpetrators

 Hans Asperger was not discovered to be involved in the programme until after his death in 1980.
 Erich Bauer, arrested in 1949 and sentenced to death, which was automatically commuted to life in prison due to West Germany's abolition of capital punishment. He died in prison in 1980.
 August Becker, initially sentenced to three years after the war, in 1960 was tried again and sentenced to ten years in prison. He was released early due to ill health and died in 1967.
 Werner Blankenburg lived under an alias and died in 1957.
 Philipp Bouhler committed suicide in captivity, May 1945.
 Werner Catel was cleared by a denazification board after World War II and was head of paediatrics at the University of Kiel. He retired early after his role in the T4 programme was exposed but continued to support the killing of children with mental and physical disabilities.
 Leonardo Conti hanged himself in captivity on 6 October 1945.
 Professor Max de Crinis committed suicide via a cyanide capsule after poisoning his family.
 Fritz Cropp d. 6 April 1984, Bremen. A Nazi official in Oldenburg, Cropp was appointed the country medical officer of health in 1933. In 1935 he transferred to Berlin, where he worked as a ministerial adviser in the Division IV (health care and people care) in the Ministry of the Interior. In 1939, he became assistant director; Cropp was involved in the Nazi "euthanasia" Aktion T4 in 1940. He was Herbert Linden's superior and was responsible for patient transfers.
 Irmfried Eberl captured 1948; committed suicide to avoid trial.
 Gottfried von Erdmannsdorff, commander of Fortress Mogilev, where many physically and mentally disabled prisoners were killed; executed by the Soviet Union in 1946.
 Ernst-Robert Grawitz killed himself shortly before the fall of Berlin in April 1945.
 Heinrich Gross was tried twice. One sentence was overturned and the charges in the second trial in 2000 were dropped as a result of his dementia; he died in 2005.
 Lorenz Hackenholt vanished in 1945.
 Philipp, Landgrave of Hesse, the governor of Hesse-Nassau, was tried in 1947 at Hadamar for his role in Aktion T4 but was sentenced only to two years' "time served"; he died in 1980.
 Werner Heyde escaped detection for 18 years and committed suicide in 1964, before his trial.
 Ernst Illing was the director of the Vienna Psychiatric-Neurological Clinic for Children Am Spielgrund, where he killed about 200 children; he was sentenced to death on 18 July 1946.
 Erich Koch served time in prison from 1950 to his death in 1986.
 Erwin Lambert died in 1976.
 Hans Lammers was sentenced to 20 years imprisonment after being convicted in the Ministries Trial. This was later commuted to 10 years and Lammers was released in 1951. He died in 1962.
 Herbert Lange was killed by Allied troops during the Battle of Berlin.
 Herbert Linden committed suicide in 1945. Overseers of the programme were initially Herbert Linden and Werner Heyde. Linden was later replaced by Hermann Paul Nitsche.
 Heinrich Matthes was sentenced to life imprisonment at the Treblinka trials.
 Friedrich Mennecke died in 1947 while awaiting trial.

 Franz Niedermoser, chief doctor of the Klagenfurt extermination center, was executed in 1946 after being convicted in the Klagenfurt trial.
 Paul Nitsche was tried and executed by an East German court in 1948.
 Hermann Pfannmüller served five years in prison as an accessory to murder.
 Franz Reichleitner was killed by Italian partisans in 1944.
 Professor Carl Schneider hanged himself in his prison cell in 1946, while awaiting trial.
 Franz Schwede was sentenced to 10 years in prison in 1948 and was released in 1956; he died in 1960.
 Franz Stangl, after being caught in Brazil in 1967, was sentenced to life imprisonment. He died of heart failure six months into the sentence.
 Rudolf Tröger was killed in action at the Maginot Line.
 Marianne Türk was a doctor at Vienna Psychiatric-Neurological Clinic for Children Am Spielgrund where, with Ernst Illing, she killed 200 children. She was sentenced to 10 years prison on 18 July 1946.
 Albert Widmann was convicted in two trials in the 1960s and served six years in prison.
 Christian Wirth was killed by Yugoslav partisans in 1944.

Those files became available to the public after German Reunification in 1990, leading to a new wave of research on these wartime crimes.

Memorials
The German national memorial to the people with disabilities murdered by the Nazis was dedicated in 2014 in Berlin. It is located in the pavement of a site next to the Tiergarten park, the location of the former villa at Tiergartenstraße 4 in Berlin, where more than 60 Nazi bureaucrats and doctors worked in secret under the "T4" programme to organise the mass murder of sanatorium and psychiatric hospital patients deemed unworthy to live.

See also

Notes

Footnotes

References

Books
 
 
 
 
 
 
 
 
 
 
 
 
 
 
 
 
 
 
 
 
 
 
 
 
 
 
 
 
 
 
 
 
 
 
 
 
 
 
 
 
 
 
 
 
 
 
 
 
 
 

Conferences
 

Journals
 
 
 
 
 
 
 

Newspapers
 
 

Websites

Further reading
Books
 
 
 
 
 
 
 
 
 
 
 
 
 
 

Journals
 

Websites

External links

 Website with photo of Philipp Bouhler and facsimile of Hitler's letter to Bouhler and Brandt authorising the T4 programme
 United States Holocaust Memorial Museum Final Solutions: Murderous Racial Hygiene 1939–1945
 United States Holocaust Memorial Museum Euthanasia programme
 Nazis euthanasia files made public by the BMJ/British Medical Association: files relating to the 200,000 euthanasia crimes

 
Nazi eugenics
The Holocaust in Germany
The Holocaust in Austria
The Holocaust in Poland
Law in Nazi Germany
Psychiatry controversies
The Holocaust
Political abuses of psychiatry
Euthanasia law
20th-century mass murder in Germany
Ableism